The Colossus of Maroussi is an impressionist travelogue by American writer Henry Miller that was first published in 1941 by Colt Press of San Francisco. Set in pre-war Greece of 1939, it is ostensibly an exploration of the "Colossus" of the title, George Katsimbalis, a poet and raconteur. The work is frequently heralded as Miller's best.

Background
In 1939, American writer Henry Miller left Paris, his home of nine years, as the Nazis began to take action in Europe and the outbreak of the Second World War loomed. In need of rejuvenation, he traveled to Greece at the invitation of his friend, British writer Lawrence Durrell, who lived in Corfu. Miller had already published what are considered some of his best-known works, including Tropic of Cancer, Black Spring, and Tropic of Capricorn.

Miller drew his Colossus from events that occurred and landscapes he encountered while living for nine months in Greece. His portrayal of poet Katsimbalis and the country is tempered by the outbreak of the Second World War, which forced him to leave for the United States in December 1939. Miller wrote the book in New York, and it reflects his resentment at having to return to America, as well as his feeling of isolation there.

Content

Miller travels in Athens, Crete, Corfu, Poros, Hydra and Delphi. As he describes these places, he also portrays Greek writer George Katsimbalis (the "Colossus" of the book's title). Among other characters are Lawrence Durrell, his first wife Nancy, and Theodore Stephanides. Some critics said that the Colossus is more of a self-portrait of Miller himself. They have also noted the influence of D. H. Lawrence and Ernest Hemingway as expressed in this book.

Critical reception
Critics consider this to be Miller's best, a view which the author also held. Pico Iyer describes the novel as an "ecstatic ramble". Will Self depicts Miller in the novel as "a relentless fabulist who advances solipsism to the status of one of the fine arts."

References 

Works by Henry Miller
Fiction set in 1939
Novels set in the 1930s
1941 American novels
American memoirs
American autobiographical novels
Literary memoirs
American travel books
Novels set in Crete